Allium stamineum is a species of flowering plant in the Amaryllidaceae family. It is an onion found in the Middle East (from the islands of the eastern Aegean south to Saudi Arabia and east to Iran).

formerly included
Two names have been coined for taxa at the varietal and subspecific levels for plants now classified by the World Checklist as distinct species.
Allium stamineum var. alpinum Post - now called Allium rupicola Boiss. ex Mouterde
Allium stamineum subsp. decaisnei (C.Presl) Kollmann - now called Allium decaisnei C.Presl

References

stamineum
Flora of Western Asia
Onions
Plants described in 1859
Taxa named by Pierre Edmond Boissier